Karalliyadde Banḍāra was King of Kandy, who ruled from 1551 to 1581. During his reign Banḍāra publicly embraced Catholicism, brought to the island by the Portuguese. He and his infant daughter princess Kusumāsana Devi fled the kingdom with his retinue. The princess was later baptized by the Portuguese and called Dona Catarina. He succeeded his father Jayavira Bandara as king and was succeeded by his daughter Kusumasana Devi.

See also
 List of Sri Lankan monarchs

References

Citations

Bibliography

External links
 Kings & Rulers of Sri Lanka
 Codrington's Short History of Ceylon

House of Siri Sanga Bo
1581 deaths